Back in Town may refer to:

 Back in Town (George Carlin album), 1996
 Back in Town (Matt Dusk album), 2006
 Back in Town (Mel Tormé album), 1959
 Back in Town (The Kingston Trio album), 1964
 Back in Town (Rob Schneiderman album), 2004